Nuh may refer to:

 Nuh (city),   Nuh district, Haryana, India
 Nuh district, Haryana
 Nūḥ, the 71st sura of the Qur'an

People
 Nuh (name), list of people with this name

 Nuh (prophet), a prophet in the Qur'an, known as Noah in the Old Testament
 Nuh I of Samanid (died 954), amir of the Samanids
 Nuh II of Samanid (died 997), amir of the Samanids

See also
 NUH (disambiguation)